Jasmin Trtovac (Serbian Cyrillic: Јасмин Тртовац; born 27 December 1986) is a Serbian footballer who plays for Serbian club Novi Pazar.

He had previously played for Novi Pazar, Gloria Bistrița and Gaz Metan Mediaș.

References

External links
 Profile on SrbijaFudbal
 
 

Living people
1986 births
Sportspeople from Novi Pazar
Bosniaks of Serbia
Serbian footballers
Association football defenders
Serbian SuperLiga players
Liga I players
TFF First League players
FK Novi Pazar players
ACF Gloria Bistrița players
CS Gaz Metan Mediaș players
Büyükşehir Belediye Erzurumspor footballers
Serbian expatriate footballers
Serbian expatriate sportspeople in Romania
Expatriate footballers in Romania
Serbian expatriate sportspeople in Turkey
Expatriate footballers in Turkey